USCGC Chincoteague (WPB-1320) is an Island-class cutter of the United States Coast Guard. The third Coast Guard vessel to bear the name, Chincoteague was constructed at Bollinger Machine Shop and Shipyard in Lockport, Louisiana.  She was commissioned on 8 August 1988.

Assigned to operate from Mobile, Alabama, later she was reassigned to Key West, Florida to serve with Coast Guard Group Key West, while her current home port is San Juan, Puerto Rico. Chincoteague has served in the search and rescue, maritime law enforcement, the war on drugs, and Alien Migrant Interdiction Operations, rescuing thousands of migrants from throughout the Caribbean, and seizing thousands of pounds of illegal drugs.

Towards the end of 2009, Chincoteague was drydocked for maintenance and repairs  in Tampa, Florida by Riverhawk Marine.

Armament
Chincoteague is normally armed with a single Mk 38 Bushmaster 25mm chain gun forwards, and a pair of M2 .50-caliber machine guns. However, the ship has been modified to allow for quick installation of the Bolt On Weapons System (BOWS) in place of its towing equipment, which would add a second Mk 38 cannon with ammo storage, and a launcher for FIM-92 Stinger MANPADS anti-aircraft missiles.

MY Titanic rescue 
Upon receiving Titanics distress call, Chincoteague was dispatched to tow the stricken vessel, assisted by the tug Mitchel, to Frederiksted, United States Virgin Islands.

References 

Ships of the United States Coast Guard
Island-class patrol boats
Ships built in Lockport, Louisiana
1988 ships